Mohamed Khalladi (born 23 March 1942) is a Tunisian handball player. He competed in the men's tournament at the 1972 Summer Olympics.

References

1942 births
Living people
Tunisian male handball players
Olympic handball players of Tunisia
Handball players at the 1972 Summer Olympics
Place of birth missing (living people)